Archibald Cameron may refer to:

Archibald Cameron of Lochiel (1707–1753), Jacobite leader
Archibald Donald Cameron (1866–1946), minister of the Free Church of Scotland
Sir Archibald Cameron (British Army officer) (1870–1944), British general
Archibald Cameron (sailor) (1919–1987), Canadian Olympian

See also
Archie Cameron (1895–1956), Australian politician